The Runaway Sleigh Ride! is a 1983 Astrid Lindgren children's book. set at Christmastime. it was published in English in 1984.

Plot
It's snowing at Junibacken. Madicken and Lisabet go out playing in the snow. The upcoming day, Madicken gets sick and Lisabet and Alva go out Christmas shopping. Suddenly, Lisabet disappears into the forest by sleigh.

See also
 List of Christmas-themed literature

References

1983 children's books
Christmas novels
Works by Astrid Lindgren
Christmas children's books